Dance with the Wind is an album by Mary Youngblood, released through Silver Wave Records on May 23, 2006. In 2007, the album won Youngblood a Grammy Award for Best Native American Music Album.

Track listing
All songs by Mary Youngblood, unless noted otherwise.

 "Misty Rain" (Daub, Youngblood) – 3:55
 "Wind Whispers" (Wasinger, Youngblood) – 3:27
 "My Gypsy Soul" (Daub, Youngblood) – 3:22
 "Play with Me" – 4:29
 "Dance with Me" (Wasinger, Youngblood) – 3:00
 "Find the Song" (Wasinger, Youngblood) – 4:32
 "Lost Long Ago" (Daub, Youngblood) – 4:19
 "Make an Offering" – 4:34
 "Reach for the Sky"  – 4:40
 "Blood of My Blood" (Wasinger – 3:14
 "On Our Journey" (Bensing, Youngblood) – 3:56
 "Dance with the Wind" – 5:15

Personnel
 Billy Bensing – composer
 Eric Levine – violin
 James Marienthal – piano, executive producer
 Mark McCoin – percussion, drums
 Jody Price – viola
 Valerie Sanford – design
 Larry Thompson – drums
 Ray Wasinger – drums
 Tom Wasinger – dulcimer, bass, guitar, mandolin, percussion, chimes, composer, drums, stick, zither, melodica, kora, producer, engineer, cittern, cimbalom, chamberlin, mixing, hand drums, cahones
 Mary Youngblood – flute, composer, flute (alto), vocals, poetry, producer, liner notes

References

2006 albums
Mary Youngblood albums
Grammy Award for Best Native American Music Album